Marakei is a small atoll in the North Gilbert Islands. It consists of a central lagoon with numerous deep basins, surrounded by two large islands separated by two narrow channels.

Geography 
A 26-kilometre (16 mi.) road circles the island. Its greatest width is at the village of Rawannawi, and narrowest width at Temotu on the island's western side. It is one of only two islands in Kiribati that encircles its lagoon. The Marakei lagoon contains salt water and is deep in some areas, but not tidal. Two narrow channels, Baretoa Pass and Raweta Pass, link the lagoon with the sea and are not navigable at low tide.

Rawata Pass was the location of an obstruction in 1912 after an inter-village conflict.

Environmental issues 
The construction of causeways caused a significant reduction in the flushing of the lagoon, reducing the water's oxygen levels so that fish are no longer found in it. Erosion and accretion along the shoreline has been linked to aggregate mining, and land reclamation and causeway construction are believed to have changed the currents along the shoreline.

Villages 
The main village is Rawannawi, which was home to just over a third of the island's 2,872 people at the 2010 census.

Myths and legends
Various stories are told about the creation of Marakei and the other islands in the Southern Gilberts. An important legend in the culture of Marakei is that spirits who lived in a tree in Samoa migrated northward, carrying branches from the tree, Te Kaintikuaba ("the Tree of Life"), and that it was these spirits, together with Nareau the Wise, who created the islands of Tungaru (the Gilbert Islands).

History
The Marakei post office opened around 1912.

Visiting Marakei 
 The katabwanin is a tradition unique to Marakei. Before engaging in any other activities, first-time visitors must pay their respects to the four ghosts of Marakei, travelling anticlockwise. It is believed that offerings of tobacco, sweets or money at the shrines of Nei Reei, Nei Rotebenua, Nei Tangangau and Nei Nantekimam will secure a happy stay in Marakei.

Airport

Marakei is served by Marakei Airport at the island's northern tip, close to the village of Rawannawi. Air Kiribati operates three flights each week to Abaiang and the international airport at Tarawa.

Accommodation

The Council guesthouse on Marakei is overlooks the ocean, just outside the main village of Rawannawi.  Like all Island Council guesthouses in Kiribati, its facilities are basic and food is what is available locally; however its spectacular location and the Marakei tradition of hospitality mean that a visit can be a once-in-a-lifetime experience for the well prepared traveler.

Notes

References

Gilbert Islands
Atolls of Kiribati